Bystrov, Bystrow or Bistrov is a Russian male surname. Its feminine counterpart is Bystrova, Bistrova or Bystrowa. The surname is derived from the word быстрый (bystry, meaning "quick") and may refer to:

 Alexey Bystrow (1899–1959), Russian paleontologist, anatomist, and histologist
 Dmitri Bystrov (1967–2005), Russian footballer
 Galina Bystrova (1934–1999), Soviet athlete who competed mainly in the pentathlon
 Mikhail Bystrov Head of Russian "troll farm" Internet Research Agency
 Nataliya Bystrova (born 1947), Soviet Olympic swimmer
 Nina Bystrova (born 1944), Russian rower
 Pyotr Bystrov (born 1979), Russian footballer
 Vladimir Bystrov (born 1984), Russian footballer
 Vladimír Bystrov (1935–2010), Czech journalist, film critic, commentator and translator

See also 
 Cape Bystrova
 Bistroff

Russian-language surnames